Alifeira is a mountain village and a former municipality in Elis, West Greece, Greece. Since the 2011 local government reform it is part of the municipality Andritsaina-Krestena, of which it is a municipal unit. The municipal unit has an area of 96.678 km2. The seat of the municipality was in the village of Kallithea.

Subdivisions
The municipal unit Alifeira is subdivided into the following communities (constituent villages in brackets):
Alifeira (Alifeira, Pefki)
Amygdalies (Amygdalies, Kato Amygdalies, Keramidi, Krana)
Kallithea (Kallithea, Barakitika)
Livadaki (Livadaki, Ptelea, Raptis)
Myronia (Myronia, Sylimna, Agios Vlasis, Klima, Rama)
Vresto (Vresto, Longo)

Geography

Alifeira is situated in a mountainous and forested area, with many deep river valleys. The river Alfeios forms the northern border of the municipal unit. It is about 10 km northwest of Andritsaina, 20 km southeast of Krestena, 40 km southeast of Pyrgos and 50 km west of Tripoli. The Greek National Road 76 (Krestena - Karytaina - Megalopoli) runs through the municipal unit.

History

The ancient Arcadian town Aliphera was located in the Parrhasia country, 40 stadia (about 8 km) from ancient Heraea. It took part in the colonization of Megalopolis in 371 BC and was member of the Arcadian League. The name originates from Alipheros, son of Lycaon. In the city there were sanctuaries of Athena and Asclepius.  In 224 BC Lydiades, tyrant of Megalopolis, gave the town to the Eleans. It was taken by Philip V of Macedon in 219 BC after a long siege, and later it joined the Achaean League and minted its own currency. Later, the city was subject to the Romans.

The first excavations were done by Anastasios Orlandos in 1932. In the ancient city the temples of Athena and Asclepius, the acropolis, the cemetery wall and some buildings have been found.

Historical population

See also

 List of settlements in Elis

References

External links

Populated places in Elis